Nineta Bărbulescu (born 23 February 1968) is a Romanian career diplomat, and current Ambassador of Romania to Malaysia and (non-resident) Brunei. She served as the Romanian Ambassador to Australia from August 2013 until December 2020. During these 7 years she also was accredited non-resident Ambassador to New Zealand (2015–2020), Fiji (2018–2020), Independent State of Samoa (2018–2020), Solomon Islands (2018–2020), Vanuatu (2018–2020), Kiribati (2018–2020), Tuvalu (2019–2020), and Nauru (2019–2020).

Early years 
Nineta Dragomir was born in 1968 in Galați, near the Danube, and attended the Vasile Alecsandri National College. In 1992, she received a Masters of International Public Law degree magna cum laude at the University of Bucharest. Nineta was a lecturer and visiting professor for public international law to the following Romanian universities; University of Bucharest (Law Faculty), Dimitrie Cantemir University, Titu Maiorescu University, and the Nicolae Titulescu Law Institute.

In 1999, together with fellow Romanian diplomat, Mr. Aurel Preda Matasaru, Nineta published "The International Court of Justice and the Law of the Sea". She also published several studies and publications dedicated to inter alia new developments in the human rights field (e.g. European citizenship), export controls field. law of the sea, International Criminal Court, International Tribunal for Rwanda and the International Court of Justice jurisprudence.

Diplomatic career

Early Career (1992–2012) 
Bărbulescu started her career in 1992 at the Ministry of Foreign Affairs (former Euro Atlantic Centre) in Bucharest. A year later she was appointed Chief of Cabinet at the Office of the Chamber of Deputies Speaker, position held until 1997. Between 1997–1999 respectively, Nineta served as First Secretary of Public International Law Directorate within the Ministry of Foreign Affairs. During the same period, Nineta served as senior expert at the NATO & Non-Proliferation Directorate within the Ministry of Foreign Affairs.

In 2000 she was appointed Deputy Director for NATO and Strategic Issues Department and the MFA representative to the Inter-Agency Council for Arms and Dual Use Export Controls.

Between 2001–2005, Bărbulescu was appointed State Secretary, President of the National Agency for Arms Export Controls (formerly ANCEX) and Head of the National Authority for the Chemical Weapons Convention implementation in Romania.

In 2002, the President of Romania awarded Bărbulescu the National Order of Merit – for her work towards the national foreign policy, involving NATO and the Treaty on the Non-Proliferation of Nuclear Weapons Directorate in MFA.

In 2010, Bărbulescu was awarded the diplomatic attaché Minister Plenipotentiary for her work at the Ministry of Foreign Affairs. Following years (2011–2012) Nineta was Chair of the Hague Code of Conduct against Ballistic Missile Proliferation, Vienna. In 2012, she also was Romanian Sous-Sherpa at the Seoul Nuclear Security Summit.

During 2007–2013 she served as Director for the following; OSCE, Asymmetrical Risks, Non Proliferation & Combating Terrorism Directorate within Ministry of Foreign Affairs. Cumulative (2010–2012) she also served as Director for Human Rights and Council of Europe Directorate. Bărbulescu managed a range of security related issues such as; Non Proliferation, disarmament, hard security topics, counter-proliferation, conventional arms topics (including small arms, light weapons (SALW) and ammunition), arms control (CFE, Open Sky, Vienna Document 1999), policies in export controls, human rights and rights of persons belonging to minorities, OSCE and Council of Europe.

Between 2010–2014 she also served as Member, Vice-Chair and Chair of the Confidentiality Commission of the Organisation for the Prohibition of Chemical Weapons. She was re-elected for her third consecutive term by the Conference of States Parties (CSP) to the Chemical Weapons Convention as Member of the OPCW Confidentiality Commission.

After being appointed Director General for Export Controls in January 2013 (within Ministry of Foreign Affairs), she initiated a package of amendments to the Romanian Arms Export Controls Law (currently in force).

Nineta also held the following positions in 2013 prior to becoming Ambassador;
 In March 2013, Vice-President of the Final UN Diplomatic Conference for adopting an Arms Trade Treaty (ATT) in New York.
 In September 2013, Head of the Multinational delegation for the Australia Group Outreach mission in Republic of Moldova.

Romanian Ambassador to Australia, New Zealand, Fiji, Kiribati, Independent State of Samoa, Vanuatu, Solomon Islands, Tuvalu and Nauru (2013–2020) 

Bărbulescu was appointed Ambassador to Australia in mid-2013 by then-President Traian Băsescu. Later in April 2015, she became non-resident ambassador to New Zealand.

In 2016, Romanian exports to Australia increased 86% to 200 Million USD.
In 2017, Bărbulescu opened the first Romanian Honorary Consulates in Perth, Western Australia , Adelaide and South Australia. In June 2018, a consular bureau was established (of Embassy of Romania) in Melbourne, Victoria, providing for the thousands of those of Romanian origins living in Victoria, Western Australia, South Australia and Tasmania.

Bărbulescu is the first Romanian Ambassador appointed to Pacific islands countries (7). In July 2018, she presented her credentials in Solomon Islands and Republic of Kiribati, and established bilateral diplomatic relations with Tarawa.

In January–March 2019, Nineta presented her credentials in Vanuatu, Samoa  and Fiji. In December 2019, Ambassador Nineta Bărbulescu became Dean of the Diplomatic Corp in Commonwealth of Australia.

In January 2020, Ambassador Nineta Bărbulescu presented her letter of credence to Mrs. Teniku Talesa General Governor of Tuvalu and in March 2020 Ambassador Nineta Bărbulescu presented her letter of credence to Mr. Lionel Aingimea President of the Republic of Nauru.

Romanian Ambassador to Malaysia and Brunei (2021–present) 
Bărbulescu was appointed Ambassador to Malaysia on January 22, 2021 by President Klaus Iohannis. She was appointed as Ambassador to Brunei on March 2, 2021. Mrs. Bărbulescu presented her credentials to King of Malaysia Al-Sultan Abdullah Ri’ayatuddin Al-Mustafa Billah Shah on November 10, 2021.

She signed two judicial treaties between Romania and Malaysia on December 6, 2021, saying "These two new bilateral treaties are contributions to multilateralism and cooperation".  Adding that "(the treaties) strengthen the future resilience of our respective countries by more effective cooperation in the suppression of crime, these treaties might also serve as an inspiration and motivation for our regional neighbors to broaden their legal avenues with countries from afar".

Personal life 
Mrs. Bărbulescu is married to Mr. Dan Bărbulescu since 1992. She has 4 sons, Tudor, Victor, Cristian, David and one granddaughter, Cheeva Ioana. Bărbulescu speaks Romanian, English and French.

Bărbulescu and her family have been residing in Malaysia since March 2021.

Honours 
 : 
 National Order of Merit
 : 
 Romanian Orthodox Church Order of Merit

Interviews 
 Romanian ambassador Nineta Barbulescu discusses investment cooperation with Sarawak
 Romanian ambassador visits Penang to collaborate on Tourism
 Romania eyes new cooperation projects with Malaysia
 Mrs Barbulescu signs two Judicial treaties that bolster Romania-Malaysian ties in late 2021
 2019 Interview with Nineta Barbulescu 
 ''2019 Interview” with Nineta Barbulescu on the 2019 EU Parliamentary elections and the referendum on justice in Romania 
 Tyler Collection strengthens ties between Tasmania and Romania, ABC News July 2019
 2018 Interview with Nineta Barbulescu on the New Consular Bureau in Melbourne 
 2018 Interview 
 Official Statement of HE Nineta Bărbulescu on the National Day of Romania Reception in 2017
 2015 Interview with Nineta Barbulescu
 Interview with Nineta Barbulescu on the Transylvania in South-West of Tasmania, Australia

References 

1968 births
Living people
Ambassadors of Romania
Ambassadors of Romania to Australia
Ambassadors of Romania to New Zealand
Ambassadors of Romania to Fiji
Ambassadors of Romania to Samoa
Ambassadors of Romania to Vanuatu
Ambassadors of Romania to the Solomon Islands
Ambassadors of Romania to Kiribati
Ambassadors of Romania to Tuvalu
Ambassadors to Australia
Ambassadors to New Zealand
Ambassadors to Fiji
Ambassadors to Samoa
Ambassadors to Vanuatu
Ambassadors to the Solomon Islands
Ambassadors to Kiribati
Ambassadors to Tuvalu
Ambassadors to Malaysia
Ambassadors to Brunei
Romanian diplomats
Anti–nuclear weapons activists
People from Galați
Recipients of the National Order of Merit (Romania)
Romanian women ambassadors
University of Bucharest alumni